Boško Marinko (Koljane, 11 August 1939 – Subotica, 18 July 2020) was a Serbian wrestler who competed in the 1968 Summer Olympics and 1972 Summer Olympics.

References

External links
 
 

1939 births
2020 deaths
People from Vrlika
Serbs of Croatia
Serbian male sport wrestlers
Olympic wrestlers of Yugoslavia
Wrestlers at the 1968 Summer Olympics
Wrestlers at the 1972 Summer Olympics
Yugoslav male sport wrestlers
Sportspeople from Banja Luka
World Wrestling Championships medalists
Mediterranean Games gold medalists for Yugoslavia
Competitors at the 1971 Mediterranean Games
Mediterranean Games medalists in wrestling
European Wrestling Championships medalists